Aganović is a surname derived from the Ottoman honorific title aga. Notable people with the surname include:

Admir Aganović (born 1986), Bosnia and Herzegovina footballer
Adnan Aganović (born 1987), footballer
Aldin Aganovic (born 2000), Austrian footballer
 (born 1902, died 1961), Bosnian imam
Almir Aganović (born 1973), Bosnia and Herzegovina volleyball player
Eldijana Aganović (born 1971), Croatian table tennis player

Bosnian surnames